Jesse N. Smith House may refer to:
 Jesse N. Smith House (Snowflake, Arizona), listed on the National Register of Historic Places in Navajo County, Arizona
 Jesse N. Smith House (Parowan, Utah), historic building in Iron County, Utah

See also
Smith House (disambiguation)